The near-open front unrounded vowel, or near-low front unrounded vowel, is a type of vowel sound, used in some spoken languages. Both the symbol and the sound are commonly referred to as "ash".

In practice,  is sometimes used to represent the open front unrounded vowel; see the introduction to that page for more information.

Features

Occurrence

See also
 Index of phonetics articles

Notes

References

External links
 

Near-open vowels
Front vowels
Unrounded vowels